Paul Pageau (born October 1, 1959) is a Canadian former professional ice hockey goaltender who played in one National Hockey League game for the Los Angeles Kings during the 1980–81 NHL season. 

As a youth, Pageau played in the 1972 Quebec International Pee-Wee Hockey Tournament with a minor ice hockey team from Gatineau. He played his Quebec Junior hockey with the Quebec Remparts and the Shawinigan Cataractes. After the NHL he spent 6 years in the minor leagues.

Pageau represented Canada at the 1980 Winter Olympics held in Lake Placid, where he was the goalie in 4 games, a win versus Poland and a shutout against Japan, and two losses in decisive games against USSR and Finland.

As of 2019 he was Vice President Ontario at Slush Puppie Canada Inc. based in Stoney Creek, Ontario.

See also
List of players who played only one game in the NHL

References

External links

1959 births
Living people
Canadian ice hockey goaltenders
Flint Generals players
Houston Apollos players
Ice hockey people from Montreal
Ice hockey players at the 1980 Winter Olympics
Los Angeles Kings players
New Haven Nighthawks players
Oklahoma City Stars players
Olympic ice hockey players of Canada
Quebec Remparts players
Saginaw Gears players
Shawinigan Cataractes players
Sherbrooke Canadiens players
Sherbrooke Jets players
Undrafted National Hockey League players